The 2016 Team Speedway Junior European Championship was the ninth Team Speedway Junior European Championship season. It was organised by the Fédération Internationale de Motocyclisme and was the fifth as an under 21 years of age event.

The final took place on 28 August 2016 in Stralsund, Germany. The defending champions Poland won the final once again to record their fifth consecutive title.

Results

Final
  Stralsund
 28 August 2016

See also 
 2016 Team Speedway Junior World Championship
 2016 Individual Speedway Junior European Championship

References 

2016
European Team Junior